Tristram G. Seidler is an American botanist, ecologist and professor at University of Massachusetts Amherst. His work includes studying sampling biases in herbarium collections, seed dispersal patterns, and curating plant and plant cell culture collections for use in research.

References

Botanists active in North America
20th-century American botanists
21st-century American botanists
Living people
University of California, Santa Cruz alumni
University of Massachusetts Amherst faculty
Harvard University alumni
Year of birth missing (living people)